The Sri Siva Subramaniya Temple is a Hindu temple in Nadi, Fiji. It is the largest Hindu temple in the Pacific. It is at the southern end of the main road through Nadi.

Historical background 

The original temple had been in existence for a long time. It was at the old temple building that the Then India Sanmarga Ikya Sangam (TISI Sangam) was formed in 1926. The TISI Sangam was rejuvenated following the Golden Jubilee celebration in 1976. The revival of Sangam activities with the arrival of Shivacharya Mahalinga Gurukkal, whose services were made available to Nadi Siva Subramaniya Temple in 1984 by the government of Tamil Nadu as the chief priest boosted the activities at the temple. Devotees flocked there in very large numbers to witness and participate in the many new and unique religious ceremonies conducted at the temple for the first time.

Construction of new temple 

The foundation for a new temple was laid at the old site in 1976 during the Golden Jubilee celebrations by His Excellency the High Commissioner for the government of India in Fiji. It was realised that a new and bigger national temple was needed. In 1983 new lease was acquired for the Crown land and the reconstruction programme began with the Bhoomi Pooja in January 1984, followed by the inauguration of building work by the late deputy prime minister, in April 1984. The construction work moved another step forward in 1986 when the work of pile driving was completed under the chairmanship of Hon. Jai Ram Reddy. The actual construction work began in earnest after a lull of some five years under a new Reconstruction Committee led by Narayan Reddy as the chairman. The temple was built in the best traditions of ancient Dravidian Indian temple architecture as well as the principles of sacred architecture of the Vastu Vedic tradition. The consecration ceremonies of their new national temple were held on July 15, 1994.

References

External links
Fiji Visitor's Bureau

Religious buildings and structures completed in 1994
Hindu temples in Fiji